Naritaka (written: 斉荘 or 斉孝) is a masculine Japanese given name. Notable people with the name include:

 (1788–1838), Japanese daimyō
 (1810–1845), Japanese daimyō

Japanese masculine given names